The Singing Kid is a 1936 American musical film directed by William Keighley and written by Warren Duff and Pat C. Flick. Starring Al Jolson, Sybil Jason, Beverly Roberts, Edward Everett Horton, Lyle Talbot and Allen Jenkins, it was released by Warner Bros. on April 11, 1936.

Plot

Al Jackson (Jolson) has just moved into a magnificent penthouse apartment and would seem to have it all; fame, fortune, and a loyal retinue.

But his accountant has embezzled his fortune, and this brings on a nervous breakdown (as well as the loss of his voice). His doctor orders him to take a long vacation in  the country and forget all about show business, which, for Jackson, is almost impossible.

But a meeting with pretty Ruth Haines (Roberts) and her 10-year-old niece (Jason) proves therapeutic. Roberts is an aspiring playwright, and Jackson decides to make his return to Broadway using her play. But he neglects to tell Roberts of the "surprise", and Roberts assumes he is trying to steal her play.

The lover's quarrel is patched up at opening night, and the play is a rousing success.

There are several elaborate musical numbers, the best remembered being "I Love To Sing-a" and "You're The Cure For What Ails Me".

Cast        
Al Jolson as Al Jackson
Sybil Jason as Sybil Haines
Beverly Roberts as Ruth Haines
Edward Everett Horton as Davenport Rogers
Lyle Talbot as Robert 'Bob' Carey
Allen Jenkins as Joe Eddy
Claire Dodd as Dana Lawrence
Jack Durant as Babe
Frank Mitchell as Dope
Wini Shaw as Blackface Singer
Joe King as Dr. May 
William B. Davidson as Barney Hammond 
Cab Calloway as Cotton Club Band Leader
Cab Calloway and His Cotton Club Orchestra as Cotton Club Orchestra
Yacht Club Boys as Singing Quartette

References

External links 
 

1936 films
1930s English-language films
Warner Bros. films
American drama films
1936 drama films
Films directed by William Keighley
Films scored by Ray Heindorf
Films scored by Heinz Roemheld
American black-and-white films
1930s American films